Volume flux most often refers to:

 Volumetric flow rate, the volume of fluid which passes per unit time
 Volumetric flux, the rate of volume flow across a unit area